Fred 3: Camp Fred is a 2012 American comedy film directed by Jonathan Judge. It is the third and final installment in the Fred trilogy, following Fred 2: Night of the Living Fred. Released on July 28, 2012, the film stars Lucas Cruikshank, Tom Arnold, Jake Weary, and John Cena. Like its predecessors, the film received negative reviews.

Plot 

Following the last day of school, Fred Figglehorn (Lucas Cruikshank) reveals his hopes to attend a very popular and luxurious summer camp named Camp Superior, but his dreams are dashed when he learns his mother is sending him to Camp Iwannapeepee instead, a camp Fred finds horrible. Upon arrival, he meets head counselor Floyd Spunkmeyer (Tom Arnold), and a host of other campers, Magoo (Joey Bragg), Chatter (Matthew Scott Miller), Spoon (Leah Lewis), and Dig (Adrian Kali Turner), and is introduced to Oksana (Madison Riley), a beautiful but incompetent Russian camp nurse.

Fred learns that Camp Iwannapeepee and Camp Superior have been competing in summer camp games for sixty-nine years and that Superior has always won. Fred tries asking his imaginary father (John Cena) for advice, but tells him that he's on his own before disappearing. Fred also thinks he has unearthed a plot to drug the food of the Iwannapeepee campers, in order for a giant rat to eat their brains in a place called "The Rat's Hole". Avoiding the gruel, he instead eats hallucinogenic red berries, and throws up when the others find him. Fred learns that Magoo, Chatter, Spoon, and Dig go to "The Rats Den" because it's a hideout they've had since being in camp. The "drug" that was put in the gruel was super-vitamins, because the gruel has no nutritional value. When he learns that his arch rival Kevin (Jake Weary) is on the team from Superior, Fred becomes determined to defeat the rival camp. When the competition begins, Camp Iwannapeepee falls behind in the contests.

After losing to Camp Superior for the day, everyone is down, and Magoo, Chatter, Spoon, and Dig don't even want to go to their hideout. Fred, on the other hand, says that they are losers, but they are good at being the best at the bad and good things they do. When the camps play the next day, Fred and Camp Iwannapeepee win the next contests that come up, much to everyone's surprise.

Kevin and Camp Superior perform a song-dance routine. When Kevin's friends say that they should stop Fred, Kevin laughs saying that Fred is horrible at singing, but has set up a tank of gruel to sabotage him just in case. Fred and Camp Iwannapeepee are nervous at first, but go on stage. Fred starts singing a made-up song of his own called "The Loser Song". It starts making Kevin and the others laugh, but as the song progresses, it makes everyone, except the members of Camp Superior, start cheering with excitement. Kevin commands the gruel to hit Fred, but Diesel says it's stuck. Camp Iwannapeepee finally wins The Summer Camp Games and Fred gets off-stage, where Kevin furiously lashes out saying that "Fred never wins." Meanwhile, Diesel continues messing with the gruel blaster, and finally activates it after realizing it wasn't plugged in, resulting in Kevin losing his clothes and being laughed offstage. As the campers leave the camp for the end of summer and prepare to go home, Fred tells his mom that he has made some new friends, and his mom has found a new man, a pizza delivery guy.

Cast
 Lucas Cruikshank as Fred Figglehorn
 Tom Arnold as Floyd Spunkmeyer; the head of Camp Iwannapeepee.
 Jake Weary as Kevin Lebow; Fred's archrival, who attends Camp Superior.
 John Cena as Dad Figglehorn; Fred's imaginary father, who appears in fridges and gives Fred advice.
 Carlos Knight as Diesel; Kevin's friend and assistant in his plans, who also attends Camp Superior.
 Adam Herschman as Murray; the inept worker of Camp Iwannapeepee.
 Joey Bragg as Magoo a nerdy, reliable kid, and one of Fred's cabin mates.
 Matthew Scott Miller as Chatter; One of Fred's cabin mates who despite his name, is fairly quiet.
 Leah Lewis as Spoon; the female member of Fred's cabin mates who always eats food, such as gruel.
 Adrian Kali Turner as Dig; One of Fred's cabin mates, who likes to dig holes.
 Siobhan Fallon Hogan as Hilda Figglehorn, Fred's mother.
 Adam Riegler as Lawrence; a camper (and a running gag as well as a perfect keyboard player) of Camp Iwannapeepee.
 Daniella Monet as Bertha; Fred's gothic friend.
 Steve Hytner as Ivan; the head counselor of Camp Superior.
 Madison Riley as Nurse Oksana; The beautiful but incompetent nurse at Camp Iwannapeepee. All the boys, aside from Fred, have crushes on her. She speaks with a Russian accent.

Production
In December 2011, it was announced that Lucas Cruikshank would be starring as Fred Figglehorn in a live action Nickelodeon series and in a third Fred film. Varsity Pictures and The Collective, who had produced the first film, would be producing the third.

Ratings
The film's initial American airing, on Nickelodeon on July 28, 2012, was watched by 3.5 million viewers. This was a 39% decline from the 5.7 million viewers, the previous film, Fred 2: Night of the Living Fred premiered with, and ranked eighteenth in top cable programming for the week.

Accolades

Home media
Fred 3: Camp Fred was released on DVD on December 4, 2012. It was also released in a triple pack box set along with Fred: The Movie and Fred 2: Night of the Living Fred on the same date.

References

External links

2012 television films
2012 films
2010s fantasy comedy films
2010s teen comedy films
American children's comedy films
American children's fantasy films
American coming-of-age films
American television films
American slapstick comedy films
American teen comedy films
Films based on web series
Lionsgate films
Films about summer camps
2010s English-language films
2010s American films